Romina Stefania Núñez (born 1 January 1994) is an Argentine footballer who plays as a midfielder for Liga MX Femenil club Club León and the Argentina women's national football team.

Early life 
Núñez was born in Tandil, Buenos Aires, Argentina.

References

References 
 
 
 
 

1994 births
Living people
People from Tandil
Sportspeople from Buenos Aires Province
Argentine women's footballers
Women's association football defenders
Club León (women) footballers
Argentina women's international footballers
Argentine expatriate women's footballers
Argentine expatriate sportspeople in Mexico
Expatriate women's footballers in Mexico